A list of notable characters from the NBC soap opera Days of Our Lives that significantly impacted storylines and debuted between January 1, 1970, and the end of 1979.

Linda Patterson

Linda Patterson was a character portrayed by Nadyne Turney in 1970 before being replaced by Margaret Mason until her departure in 1982. Elaine Princi portrayed the character from 1984-1985. Linda was Mickey Horton's secretary.

Don Craig

Don Craig was portrayed by Jed Allan from 1971 until 1985.

Don came to Salem as a successful and wealthy attorney. After fourteen years, he went to the mail to post a letter and hasn't been seen since. This fact was referred to by Anna DiMera on the March 4, 2022, episode, when Sarah Horton, believing herself to be Renée DuMonde, mentions wanting to hire Craig as a lawyer.

Mary Anderson

Mary Anderson was portrayed by many actresses including Nancy Stephens, later known for her role in the Halloween movies, Barbara Stanger played the role the longest from 1976 to 1980. Actress Melinda Fee was the last character to play the role from 1981 until the character was killed by the Salem Strangler in 1982.

Bob Anderson

Bob Anderson  was played by Mark Tapscott from July 18, 1972, to March 28, 1980. Between May 26 to July 27, 1978, he was briefly replaced by Dick Gitting. Bob and his wife Phyllis came to Salem in 1972. After Scott Banning was given a job at his company, he died in an accident. The couple took his widow Julie Olson in their home and Bob fell in love with her. He divorced Phyllis and married Julie. In 1976 also that marriage fell apart.

Bob eventually learned that Brooke Hamilton had stolen some checks from his company and was her father. His old flame Adele Winston confirmed it before she died. Bob gave Brooke a job at his company, and she then paid back what she had stolen.

In 1978, he married Linda Patterson but divorced her as well in 1980 due to her infidelities and attempts to take over his company. He had heart problems and Phyllis came back to Salem to take care of him. They rekindled their relationship and became engaged. Before they could remarry Bob died of a heart attack. In his will, he left part of his estate to Melissa Anderson, Linda's daughter by Jim Phillips, whom he had adopted.

Phyllis Anderson

Phyllis Anderson was portrayed by Nancy Wickwire before she left due to failing health. Her replacement Corinne Conley prominently had the role for the longest period until her final departure in 1982.

After Julie Olsen moved in with her and Bob, Phyllis began noticing he was taking more of his attention away from her to Julie. After their divorce, she marries Neil Curtis. He attempted to swindle her out of money to feed his gambling addiction but she made him sign a prenuptial agreement before they got married. Their marriage proved to be rocky as Neil cheated on her with Amanda Howard.  Neil and Phyllis eventually divorced and she left Salem.

Paul Grant 

Paul Grant, portrayed by Lawrence Cook was introduced in October 1975 as the patriarch of the Grant family. Paul and his wife Helen (Ketty Lester) take in the injured stranger David Smith (Richard Guthrie) when their children Valerie (Tina Andrews) and Danny (Michael Dwight Smith) invite him into their home. When David starts drinking heavily, Paul informs him that he used to be a drunk and that it only makes things worse. Fearing the trouble he will cause, Helen wants David gone but Paul refuses to put David out in the street. They are shocked to discover David's obituary in the newspaper. Confronted by the Grants, David confesses he is hiding from his family fed up with his mother Julie Anderson's (Susan Seaforth Hayes) chaotic love life. Though he is hesitant, Paul feels obligated to tell David's family that he is ok but warns Julie to keep her distance because David is not interested in seeing her. David is furious when his girlfriend Brooke Hamilton (Adrienne LaRussa) shows up and Paul admits that he couldn't keep the secret knowing how Helen would feel if Danny had suddenly disappeared. Though David reconciles with his mother when she suffers a miscarriage, he remains at the Grant home. Feeling indebted to them, David offers to help Paul find a new job. Meanwhile, Paul is suspicious of David and Val's growing closes when he finds them dancing together. Later, Paul lands a job at Bob Anderson's (Mark Tapscott) plant and while the rest of the Grant household is ecstatic, David doesn't seem too happy about it. David confesses to Paul and his great-grandfather Tom Horton (Macdonald Carey) that Brooke claims she is pregnant with David's child. Tom and Paul appeal to Brooke to tell the truth but her story does not change. After a doctor visit confirms Brooke's pregnancy, David confides in Paul and a disappointed Val. Paul warns David that marrying Brooke won't matter if they aren't happy. In 1976, at his wife's request, Paul tries to get Brooke's alcoholic mother Adele Hamilton (Dee Carroll) to admit that she has a problem but she denies it. Paul warns Brooke that she also had to admit to herself that her mother has a problem. When Adele finally comes around, Paul accompanies her to an Alcoholics Anonymous meeting at the church. David gets a job at Anderson Manufacturing working under Paul. Brooke later confides in Paul that she hates that Bob (her father) sees her as a charity case. Instead Bob gives money to Adele and she buys more alcohol. Paul finds her, dumps the alcohol and takes the rest of the money to Brooke. Paul died off-screeen of a heart attack at the plant in July 1978.

Janice Barnes

Janice Barnes is a fictional character on the NBC daytime soap opera, Days of Our Lives. The role was originated by future The Waltons actress Martha Nix on December 12, 1975, and departed the role on December 7, 1978. Nine years later the role was recast with Elizabeth Storm first airing on September 21, 1987, and departing on March 14, 1988. 

Introduced as the foster daughter of Mickey and Maggie Horton (John Clarke and Suzanne Rogers). In May 1978, Janice's biological mother Joanna (Corinne Michaels) returned to Salem and secretly began seeing Janice without Mickey and Maggie's knowledge. Joanna kidnapped Janice during an unplanned trip to Disneyland. When the two were later found, Joanna stayed in Salem to stay closer to her daughter, driving Maggie to drink, thus beginning Maggie's long struggle with alcoholism. Due to Maggie's struggle, Joanna was later granted custody of Janice and the two later depart Salem. In September 1987, Janice returned to town when Maggie was recovering through a recurrent of Myasthenia Gravis. Janice stayed in town and took a job at Salem University Hospital where she had romances with both Bill Horton (Christopher Stone) and Mike Horton (Michael T. Weiss). She was murdered in 1988 by the Riverfront Knifer, making her his second victim.

Samantha Evans

Samantha Evans was portrayed by Andrea Hall, the twin sister of fellow Days of Our Lives actress, Deidre Hall, who portrays Samantha's twin sister, Marlena. Samantha appeared from 1977 to 1980, with a brief reprisal in 1982, when the character was killed by the Salem Strangler.
Marlena named her first daughter, Samantha, after her sister.

Deidre briefly portrayed Samantha in newly created flashbacks 1992 and 2008, respectively.

Kate Winograd

Dr Kate Winograd, played by Elaine Princi, first appears in July 1977, when she is Head of Anesthesiology at Salem University Hospital. Kate befriends main character Dr Bill Horton, and they fall for each other.  Bill romances Kate, but she resists his advances. Kate departs Salem in February 1978, and returns in 1979, when she has a sexual affair with Dr Neil Curtis.

Kate and Bill's friendship begins when Bill, an accomplished surgeon, retrains in Anesthesiology after losing the ability to do surgery, thanks to a gunshot injury to his arm which causes nerve damage and impairs the use of his right hand. Bill retrains as an anesthesiologist so he can carry on working in the Operating room, and Kate supervises his re-training.

Bill clashes with new Chief of Surgery, Dr Walter Griffin, because Bill thinks Griffin does unnecessary surgeries on patients and is "knife-happy". Bill is assigned to the night shift by the Chief of Staff Greg Peters, to avoid clashes with Griffin. This puts strain on Bill's marriage with Dr Laura Horton. Kate speaks up for Bill, saying the other trainees value him, and persuades Peters to put Bill back on the day shift.

Bill's brother's neighbour Fred Barton falls downstairs and hits his head, and Bill rushes him into hospital. Fred haemorrhages and needs emergency brain-surgery, but the only surgeon available is an inexperienced junior trainee. The trainee panics in the Operating Room, and walks out. Bill has to do the surgery himself and he saves the man's life, with Kate assisting. But after the operation Barton is paralyzed from the waist down, and he sues the hospital and Bill and Kate. The trainee surgeon covers himself by saying Bill threw him out of the Operating Room; and Kate and Bill are fired from the hospital.

Both unemployed, and both fighting the suit against them, Bill and Kate spend time with each other, and become close. They go for walks, and Bill kisses Kate at Christmas. At the same time, Laura's own work commitments have also put a strain on their marriage. Unhappy with his relationship with Kate, Laura throws Bill out, and he goes to live at the Salem Inn. Although Kate is in love with him, she also won't let Bill stay with her. She won't be the "other woman".

Bill's brother Mickey persuades the young trainee surgeon to come clean about what he did; and Dr Marlena Evans helps Fred Barton realize that his paralysis is actually psychological, stemming from childhood traumas. On the day of Bill and Kate's trial, Barton walks into court! The case is thrown out, and Bill and Kate are re-instated at the hospital. That evening Bill and Kate celebrate and share a passionate kiss. But Kate breaks it off, and forces Bill to leave.

Bill has a change of heart, and realizes his love for his wife Laura. He apologizes to Kate, telling her he mistook feelings of loyalty to her as love, and that he wants to remain friends and colleagues. Kate tells him she is leaving to take a job in Cleveland, but she really is heartbroken to miss her chance with the man she loves!

In January 1979, with his hand better, Bill is offered the post of Chief of Surgery, and he accepts. Kate is over her infatuation with Bill, and with Laura's blessing, he re-hires Kate as Head of Anesthesiology. Kate assures Bill and Laura that she and Bill are now just good friends. Kate and Bill work away together when they go help flood-victims out of town.

Laura's mentally-ill mother commits suicide, and Laura is traumatized. She begins to have hallucinations of her dead mother, who tells her to do things. Laura becomes paranoid, and she accuses Kate of moving in on Bill, telling her everyone at the hospital is talking about it. Kate tries to reassure Laura that she is just friends with Bill, to no avail. As Kate's reputation is very important to her, she resigns from the hospital again. Bill asks Kate to stay near by, but she gives him the cold shoulder. In truth, Kate is having an affair with Dr Neil Curtis, and her affair with Neil has just become sexual. Kate is resolved to leave town, as she does not want to cause the breakdown of marriages.

Chris Kositchek

Chris Kositchek is a character portrayed by Josh Taylor from 1977 to 1987.

He arrived in Salem and worked as a foreman for Anderson Manufacturing, and started seeing Mary Anderson. Phyllis Anderson tried to bribe Chris to stop seeing Mary, but he turned her down and continued to see Mary, even after learning she had an affair with Dr. Neil Curtis. He also became good friends with the Bradys, Bo in particular.

He and Mary would eventually part ways, Chris continued to see other women as well as running his own gym called Body Connection. He became romantically involved with Savannah Wilder but broke it off with her after learning of her criminal activities with Victor Kiriakis.

He later became romantically involved with Amanda Peters Howard, who had returned to Salem after separating from her husband, Greg Peters. She became pregnant and Chris proposed to her. However, she suffered a miscarriage and was so depressed after losing her baby that she left town and broke up with Chris. At some point he also left Salem for good.

In 2022, Josh Taylor returned to the role after nearly thirty-five years as a guest character in Days of Our Lives: Beyond Salem. It's revealed that he eventually rekindled his relationship with Savannah and eventually married. They both run a gym in San Francisco where Paul Narita and Andrew Donovan investigate Harris Michaels.

Alex Marshall

Alex Marshall was portrayed by Quinn Redeker from 1979 until 1987.

Alex came to Salem to work for Anderson Manufacturing. He is a charming conman who got away with many crimes. After he burned down the Salem Inn to collect insurance money, he went to prison.

See also
 Days of Our Lives characters
 Days of Our Lives characters (1960s)
 Days of Our Lives characters (1980s)
 Days of Our Lives characters (1990s)
 Days of Our Lives characters (2000s)
 Days of Our Lives characters (2010s)
 Days of Our Lives cast members
 List of previous Days of Our Lives cast members

Notes and references

1970s